Bailey Chase Luetgert (born May 1, 1972) is an American stage and television actor.

Chase is known for his role as Cory Snyder in Walk. Ride. Rodeo., as Butch Ada in the television series Saving Grace, as Graham Miller in Buffy the Vampire Slayer, as Christopher "Chris" Robert Hughes (from 2003–05) in As the World Turns, as Beckett 'Becks' Scott in Ugly Betty, as Sean Everett in Damages, and as Deputy Branch Connally in A&E's crime thriller, Longmire. He starred in Summoned, Tao of Surfing, Sex, Death, & Bowling, and No Beast So Fierce.

Early life and education
Chase was born in Chicago, Illinois. He spent time growing up between Barrington, Illinois and Naples, Florida, and went to the Bolles School in Jacksonville. He attended Duke University on a full football athletic scholarship, playing linebacker. He graduated in 1995 with a degree in psychology. Taking up acting as a career, he trained at the London Academy of Music and Dramatic Art, then moved to Los Angeles to work with the improv group, The Groundlings.

Career
Earlier in his career, he was sometimes credited as Bailey Luetgert. He was a series regular on TNT's drama, Saving Grace, in the role of Detective Butch Ada. Additional credits include Charmed, Billboard Dad, The Truth About Juliet, Undressed, Pacific Blue,  Buffy the Vampire Slayer, CSI: Crime Scene Investigation, Ugly Betty, Criminal Minds, Law & Order: Special Victims Unit,  and Awake, among others.

In 2012, he was cast as Deputy Branch Connally, a foil to the lead, on the A&E western mystery series Longmire. Following his departure from Longmire, he appeared in 2016 on the NBC fantasy-drama Grimm as Lucien Petrovich, leader of the Wesen uprising. He appeared in the fifth-season episodes "Eve of Destruction", "Key Move," and "Into The Schwarzwald".

In September 2016, Deadline Hollywood announced that Chase had joined the cast of the Fox TV series 24: Legacy as Thomas Locke, agent and head of field operations at CTU. The show aired on February 5, 2017 following the Super Bowl, prior to moving to a Monday-evening time slot. He joined the cast of CBS series S.W.A.T in 2019.

Filmography

Film 
"COUNTRY ROADS CHRISTMAS"
Harris Anderson

Television

Stage 
 The Comedy of Errors (as Antipholus of Syracuse)
 Death of a Salesman
 Picnic

References

External links

 

American male television actors
American male soap opera actors
American male stage actors
Male actors from Chicago
Duke University Trinity College of Arts and Sciences alumni
1972 births
20th-century American male actors
21st-century American male actors
Living people